Marcondes Alves de Sousa (12 September 1868 – 29 April 1938) was a Brazilian politician.  He was the 14th president (governor) of the state of Espirito Santo.

References

1868 births
1938 deaths
Governors of Espírito Santo
People from Minas Gerais